Bandu Dhotre (born 1979) is an Indian wildlife activist and president of environmental organisation Eco-Pro.  For his work in rescuing wildlife, India Today has identified him as a "local hero".
He has received National Youth Award in year 2013-14 by the Ministry of Youth Affairs and Sports for his enormous contributions in the field of wildlife conservation and community service.

References 

Living people
Animal welfare workers
Indian environmentalists
1979 births